Willy's Wonderland is a 2021 American action comedy horror film directed by Kevin Lewis from a screenplay by G. O. Parsons. The film stars Nicolas Cage, who also served as producer, along with Emily Tosta, Ric Reitz, Chris Warner, Kai Kadlec, Christian Del Grosso, Caylee Cowan, Terayle Hill, Jonathan Mercedes, David Sheftell and Beth Grant. It follows a quiet drifter who is tricked into cleaning up an abandoned family entertainment center as he is stalked by eight murderous animatronic characters possessed by the souls of a cannibalistic killer and his seven psychotic acolytes.

The project was announced in October 2019, with screenwriter Parsons having conceived the idea based on his 2016 short film Wally's Wonderland, which was also the script's original name. It caught Cage's attention, who agreed to participate as both an actor and a producer. Lewis was hired as director in December 2019 while the cast joined in February 2020. Prior to its release, the film received a small cult following due to sharing its premise with the Five Nights at Freddy's franchise.

Willy's Wonderland was originally set for a worldwide theatrical release on October 30, 2020, but was postponed in response to the COVID-19 pandemic. Instead, it was released through video on demand, with a simultaneous limited theatrical release in the United States, on February 12, 2021 by Screen Media Films. The film received mixed-to-positive reviews, with praise to Cage's performance, the dark humor and the animatronics' realistic movements but with criticism for its screenplay, plot and characters.

Plot

When his vehicle breaks down outside of Hayesville, Nevada, a quiet drifter is picked up by the town's mechanic Jed Love, who takes him to Willy's Wonderland, a once-successful abandoned family entertainment center. Owner Tex Macadoo offers him to work as a night-shift janitor in exchange for repairing his vehicle before he and Jed leave him locked in the restaurant. Meanwhile, teenager Liv Hawthorne gets handcuffed by her parental guardian, Hayesville's sheriff Eloise Lund, due to her previous attempts to burn the building. When Lund leaves, Liv's friends Chris Muley, Kathy Barnes, Aaron Powers, Bob McDaniel, and Dan Lorraine come and release her.

As the Janitor begins his duties, the restaurant's now-withered eight animatronic mascots—Willy Weasel, Arty Alligator, Cammy Chameleon, Ozzie Ostrich, Knighty Knight, Tito Turtle, Gus Gorilla, and Siren Sara—are revealed to be alive and homicidal. Ozzie attacks the Janitor, who beats Ozzie to death with a mop. While her friends douse the perimeter with gasoline, Liv enters the restaurant through the vents to get the Janitor out. Meanwhile, the Janitor is attacked by Gus in the restrooms; he kills him by curb stomping his face into a urinal. In the vents, Arty chases Liv, but she escapes into a fairy-themed room where Sara kidnaps her. Liv manages to fend off Sara and encounters the Janitor, who ignores her warnings about the animatronics and refuses to leave.

Outside the restaurant, Liv's friends climb to the roof, which collapses, causing them to fall into the building. While the Janitor cleans the kitchen, Liv explains that Willy's Wonderland was originally owned by Jerry Robert Willis, a notorious serial killer. With his seven cannibalistic colleagues, he often murdered unsuspecting families, but the authorities eventually discovered them. They committed a satanic ritual to transfer their souls into the animatronics before committing suicide. When Liv finishes, several animatronics awaken and attack the group. In the ensuing chaos, Knighty impales Aaron with his sword, Tito and Sara devour Dan alive, and Arty mauls Kathy and Bob to death in a party room. With Liv standing in awe, the Janitor decapitates Knighty and breaks Arty's jaws, killing them both.

As Cammy stalks him in an arcade, Chris calls Lund for help; she goes with deputy sheriff Evan Olson upon learning that Liv is there. On the way, Lund reveals to Evan that after Willy's Wonderland was shut down, the animatronics continued murdering people around Hayesville until she, Tex and Jed made a deal with them. Over the years, they tricked random drifters into cleaning up the building, offering them as sacrifices in order to stop the animatronics' killing spree. Liv's parents were among the victims and a guilty Lund adopted her. When the Janitor and Liv arrive at the arcade, Cammy snaps Chris' neck, killing him. They subdue Cammy and attempt to leave before Lund and Evan stop them. Lund handcuffs the Janitor and leaves him to die as Evan takes Liv away. While driving back, Evan is attacked and killed by a stowaway Tito while Liv escapes.

In the restaurant, the Janitor subdues Sara, and twists Cammy's head, killing her. Enraged, Lund tries to lure Willy to kill the Janitor, only for Willy to tear her in half. Willy and the Janitor fight each other until the Janitor rips Willy's head off. The next morning, Tex and Jed return to the building and find it completely clean, with the animatronics missing. The Janitor receives his repaired vehicle and invites Liv to accompany him. While Tex and Jed discuss planning to re-open Willy's Wonderland, Sara suddenly appears and sets their car on fire with gasoline. All three are killed in a massive explosion that also destroys the entire restaurant. As the sun rises, the Janitor and Liv drive out of the town, running into and killing a wandering Tito along the way.

Cast

Human cast

Also appearing in the film are Jason Tyler as Eric Miller, a construction worker hired to demolish the restaurant; Ryan Kightlinger as a biker hired as a previous janitor; Joseph and Jessica Teagle as a Hippie couple also hired as previous janitors; Lawreen K. Yakkel, Ashann Bachan, Kevin Brown, Eduardo Lozano, Nathaniel Smith Jr., and D. J. Stavropoulos as members of Jerry Robert Willis' satanic cult; Michael Woodruff, J. J. Madaris, Robert Howell, Chris Speck, Benton Eden, and Elliott Boswell as ATF agents; Jared Soto as a homeless man; Kandace Lee as a smoker killed by Willy Weasel, and Miles Woodruff as a birthday boy from the flashbacks.

Animatronic cast

Production

Development
The film was first announced in October 2019 by Screen Media Films after screenwriter and producer G. O. Parsons was advised to create a film to expand his career around 2015 to early 2016, but was displeased with his first attempt, a short film titled Wally's Wonderland. He put the script on Blood List, seeking to have it produced as a full-length film. Shortly after, Deadline Hollywood confirmed that Nicolas Cage had joined the cast after the script, which became popular on the site, caught his attention. Cage also agreed to produce the film along with producers Jeremy Davis from JD Entertainment and veteran actor-turned-producer Grant Cramer from Landafar Entertainment, in collaboration with Mike Nilon from Cage's Saturn Films. Kevin Lewis was hired as director while the cast, including Emily Tosta, Beth Grant and Ric Reitz, joined in February 2020.

After the announcement, the film received a small cult following, with many comparing it to the Five Nights at Freddy's video game series, although Parsons and Lewis denied any similarities. The custom pinball machine in the film was based on the 1982 Gottlieb table Devil's Dare. Certain changes were made during production; the title was changed from Wally's Wonderland to Willy's Wonderland due to legal issues; and original animatronic characters Douglas Dog, Pauly Penguin, Beary Bear, Pirate Pete, and Regina Rabbit were replaced with Arty Alligator, Tito Turtle, Gus Gorilla, Knighty Knight, and Cammy Chameleon, respectively.

Filming 
Principal photography began in February 2020 for a month in various parts of Atlanta, Georgia. The crew used a desolated bowling alley in the Sprayberry Crossing shopping center in East Cobb, Marietta for the fictional Willy's Wonderland family entertainment center, setting-up a huge basecamp with housing facilities for the crew members due to the COVID-19 pandemic restrictions. Special effects for the film were done by production designer Molly Coffee, whose expertise in design and fabrication with puppetry helped to create the visual movement and appearance for the eight animatronic characters.

Music

On February 12, 2021, Filmtrax LTD released the score soundtrack for the film composed by Émoi. Producer Grant Cramer performed a track titled "Just The Way I Roll", which appeared in the film's end credits.

Marketing
On January 29, 2021, to promote the film, G. O. Parsons announced on his Twitter feed that original Willy's Wonderland T-shirts identical to the staff shirt Nicolas Cage wears in the film, would be available.

Comic book series
On June 25, 2021, Parsons confirmed that American Mythology Productions would release a comic book series serving as a prequel to the film.

First issue
Its first issue was released in October 2021. It centers on the backstories of the animatronic characters. Jerry Robert Willis is an American serial killer who preys on families who hire him as a professional photographer out of some sadistic pleasure.

Siren Sara is depicted as a dance teacher who, upon seeing her assistant, Debbie, making out with Gary, her boyfriend (or possible husband), suddenly snaps and kills them both with an ax. Soon after, Willis is convicted of the killings and Sara is also detained. They team up in their satanic pact to kill everyone.

The story also shows the re-opening of Willy's Wonderland after the deaths of Jerry and his colleagues by Tex and Jed despite protests from the public and the Sheriff. After the animatronics kill a few of the staff, Jed confesses to Tex that the spirits of Jerry and the others are inside the animatronics, but Tex decides to keep the place open as he and Jed dispose of the bodies.

Second issue
In the second comic, the backstory of Gus the Gorilla is revealed. He is depicted as a zookeeper who is socially impaired. Upon being reprimanded at the hands of his boss for feeding one of the gorillas a banana, he snaps suddenly and beats her into oblivion, and is captured by law enforcement.

Later on, it is revealed that the Cammy Chameleon animatronic is a woman going by the last name of "Love" and has a split personality in her deranged, psychopathic, and child-like immature mind, and her normal shy persona in the same comic and is revealed to be Jed Love's sister.

It is revealed that the Arty Alligator animatronic is possessed by former art teacher turned infamous serial killer Arthur Allen, also called "The Bloody Banksy", who mauled people to death and then made artwork with their blood, declaring the world to be a blank canvas, and he is giving it color with each murder.

After the animatronics kill more staff and guests, Jed is hesitant to keep the restaurant open, but Tex is approached by a wealthy family offering him money for a private birthday party for their child which Tex reluctantly agrees, despite Jed's protests. During the party, Willy and the rest of the mascots attack and kill the attending guests and staff forcing an evacuation. The sheriff and then Deputy Lund force the restaurant to be closed and torn down, but Jed states that it will only aggravate Willy and the others.

Third issue
The third comic was released on March 30, 2022, showing the origins of Tito Turtle, Ozzie Ostrich and Knighty Knight.

Tito the Turtle is an unnamed laborer who, upon being ridiculed for his love of turtles, killed every single last one of his co-workers, and was caught shortly after where he met Jerry Robert Willis and Love, joining the "Crazy 8".

Ozzie Ostrich is revealed to be a serial killer going by the epithet "The Midnight Strangler". After his abusive mother strangled him so hard his vocal cords stopped working, he became a serial killer who preyed on women attending university.

Knighty Knight was a former renaissance fair employee who, after being insulted for his attire, impaled a guest with his sword, and became the last to join the "Crazy 8" who then escape from the facility.

After the town hires a crew of builders to demolish the restaurant, Willy and the others leave the restaurant and proceed to kill the foreman and the rest of the builders before slaughtering several townspeople and massacring a basketball game. After the killings, the Sheriff, Deputy Lund, and a mob head to Willy's Wonderland with intent to destroy the animatronics.

Release
Willy's Wonderland was scheduled for worldwide theatrical release on October 30, 2020, but was removed from the calendar due to the COVID-19 pandemic causing the closure of theaters across the globe. It was announced on January 15, 2021 that it would be available for digital distribution. It was eventually released through video on demand and received a limited theatrical release on February 12, 2021. Due to being delayed by the pandemic, it was released in Saudi Arabia on September 23, 2021.

Box office
Willy's Wonderland grossed $418,286 in North America and grossed $38,858 in other territories for a worldwide total of $457,144, against a budget of $5 million.

The film grossed around $97,164 in its opening day and made $107,145 over the four-day Presidents' Day weekend. The following day, it grossed $203,886, with Croatia grossing $12,734 and the UAE grossing $14,191.

Critical response
On review aggregator website Rotten Tomatoes, the film holds an approval rating of 60% based on 89 reviews, with an average rating of 5.7/10. The site's critical consensus reads: "Willy's Wonderland isn't quite as much fun as its premise would suggest -- but it's still got Nicolas Cage beating the hell out of bloodthirsty animatronics, which is nice." Metacritic, which uses a weighted average, assigned the film a score of 44 out of 100, based on 14 critics, indicating "mixed or average reviews".

Varietys Owen Gleiberman wrote: "Kevin Lewis's giant-furry-funhouse-mascot slasher movie knows how preposterous it is but plays it straight". Nick De Semlyn of Empire gave the film a score of three out of five stars, concluding that, "though the dialogue and plotting are no great shakes, that commitment to the concept, combined with Cage's swaggering soda-swigger, is enough to make this a good time." IGN's Matt Fowler rated the film six out of ten, writing that "There's not enough here to score high marks, but there's cartoonish carnage aplenty and that warrants a passing grade." Anton Bitel from VODzilla.com awarded the film a score of seven out of ten, saying: "It is set in an amusement centre for children, but comes with adult doses of foul-mouthed language, sex, gore and death. Its scenarios feel a little rote, but are enlivened by the craziness that Cage brings to everything".

Kimberley Elizabeth from Nightmare on Film Street gave the film a score of 7.5/10, commenting: "Nicolas Cage['s] unique brand of kickassery is the jelly to this animatronic PB & J Horror sandwich". Alix Turner of Ready Steady Cut wrote: "Daft plot, fabulous fight scenes, teenagers in peril and plenty of gore. Sure, the film could have been better, but it didn't exactly need to be: this was thoroughly entertaining" and gave to it a rating of 3.5 on 5. Charles Barfield of The Playlist gave a similar opinion and rated the film with a "B+". Nicolás Delgadillo of DiscussingFilm.net called the film "unapologetically ridiculous" and "a bizarre hidden gem thrown into Cage's already vast and eclectic body of work."

Possible sequel
In an interview, G. O. Parsons stated he had an idea for a sequel if the film got enough support. In February 2021, it was announced that a sequel was being actively discussed.

See also
 The Banana Splits Movie, a similar horror film with murderous animatronics.

References

External links

 
 
 

2021 films
2021 action comedy films
2021 comedy horror films
2020s American films
2020s action comedy films
2020s comedy horror films
2020s action horror films
2020s supernatural horror films
2020s English-language films
2020s monster movies
American action comedy films
American comedy horror films
American action horror films
American supernatural horror films
American robot films
American monster movies
American splatter films
American films about revenge
American films with live action and animation
Puppet films
Films adapted into comics
Features based on short films
Films about weasels
Films about fairies and sprites
Films about lizards
Fictional chameleons and geckos
Films about birds
Fictional flightless birds
Films about turtles
Films about apes
Fictional gorillas
Films about crocodilians
Talking animals in fiction
Films about obsessive–compulsive disorder
Films about birthdays
Films about animation
Films about death
Films about Satanism
Films set in Nevada
Films shot in Atlanta
Films set in 2020
Films postponed due to the COVID-19 pandemic
Films impacted by the COVID-19 pandemic